Prince Frederick's Barge is a  British state barge. Designed by William Kent, it was built on the South Bank by John Hall for Frederick, Prince of Wales in 1732. Upon Frederick's death in 1751, the barge was used by successive British monarchs until 1849 when she was cut up into three sections and stored in the Royal Barge House at Windsor Great Park. King George VI placed the barge on loan to the National Maritime Museum in 1951, where it is currently on display.

See also
State Barge of Charles II 
Queen Mary's Shallop
Gloriana

References 

General

External links 
 

1730s ships
Barges
Museum ships in the United Kingdom
Ships and vessels of the National Historic Fleet
Ships preserved in museums
Frederick, Prince of Wales